A Thousand Stars Explode in the Sky is a play collaboratively written by David Eldridge, Robert Holman and Simon Stephens. It premiered at the Lyric Hammersmith on 7 May 2010 and ran until 5 June 2010.

Summary 

The end of the world is approaching, an apocalypse scheduled for a fortnight's time. As the universe begins to crumble a mother gathers her five sons on their family farm near Middlesbrough, where they prepare to face the unknown. A lifetime's worth of closely guarded secrets begin to unravel and a love once lost may again be found.

Creative team 

Directed by Sean Holmes
Designed by Jon Bausor
Lighting by Adam Silverman
Sound by Nick Manning

Original cast 
Kirsty Bushnell
Nigel Cooke
Lisa Diveney
Harry McEntire
Ann Mitchell
Tanya Moodie
Tom Mothersdale
Pearce Quigley
Andrew Sheridan
Rupert Simonian
Alan Williams

References

2010 plays
Plays set in England
Plays by Simon Stephens